The Central African passport is issued to citizens of the Central African Republic for international travel.

As of 1 January 2017, Central African Republic citizens had visa-free or visa on arrival access to 46 countries and territories, ranking the Central African Republic passport 89th in terms of travel freedom (tied with Equatorial Guinean passport) according to the Henley visa restrictions index.

Languages
The data page/information page is printed in French.

See also 
 List of passports
 Visa requirements for Central African Republic citizens

References

Passports by country
Government of the Central African Republic